William Muirhead was a Protestant Christian missionary who served with the London Missionary Society during the late Qing Dynasty in China.

Works authored or edited

 Hymns of Praise. 38 leaves. Shanghai, 1858. By Rev. William Muirhead. This is a collection of 100 hymns in the Shanghai dialect, prefaced by a statement of thirty principal doctrines of the Christian religion, with an elaborate detail of pertinent Scripture texts under each. A subsequent edition was published in 55 leaves.
 Salvation Hymns. 39 leaves. Shanghai, 1861. By Rev. William Muirhead. This is a collection of 69 hymns.
 Shanghai Hymn Book, 132 hymns, by William Muirhead, D.D. 1888.

References

Notes

Year of birth missing
Year of death missing
Protestant missionaries in China
Protestant writers
English Protestant missionaries
British expatriates in China